Pharyngealization is a secondary articulation of consonants or vowels by which the pharynx or epiglottis is constricted during the articulation of the sound.

IPA symbols
In the International Phonetic Alphabet, pharyngealization can be indicated by one of two methods:
A tilde or swung dash (IPA Number 428) is written through the base letter (typographic overstrike). It is the older and more generic symbol.

Computing codes 
Since Unicode 1.1, there have been two similar superscript characters: IPA  (U+02E4 ) and Semiticist  (U+02C1 ). U+02E4 is formally a superscript  (U+0295 , = reversed glottal stop), and in the Unicode charts looks like a simple superscript , though in some fonts it looks like a superscript reversed lower-case letter glottal stop . In the Unicode charts it looks like a reversed  (U+02C0 ), which is used in the IPA for glottalization. There is no parallel Unicode distinction for modifier glottal stop. The IPA Handbook lists U+02E4 as the Unicode equivalent of IPA Number 423, the dedicated IPA symbol for pharyngealization. 

The superimposed tilde is assigned Unicode character U+0334. This was originally intended to combine with other letters to represent pharyngealization. However, that usage is now deprecated (though still functional), and several precomposed letters have been adopted to replace it. These are the labial consonants  and the coronal consonants .

Usage
Ubykh, an extinct Northwest Caucasian language spoken in Russia and Turkey, used pharyngealization in 14 pharyngealized consonants. Chilcotin has pharyngealized consonants that trigger pharyngealization of vowels. Many languages (such as Salishan, Sahaptian) in the Plateau culture area of North America also have pharyngealization processes that are triggered by pharyngeal or pharyngealized consonants, which affect vowels.

The Tuu/“Khoisan” language Taa (or !Xóõ) has pharyngealized vowels that contrast phonemically with voiced, breathy and epiglottalized vowels. That feature is represented in the orthography by a tilde under the respective pharyngealized vowel. In Tuu languages, epiglottalized vowels are phonemic.

For many languages, pharyngealization is generally associated with more dental articulations of coronal consonants. Dark l tends to be dental or denti-alveolar, but clear l tends to be retracted to an alveolar position.

Arabic and Syriac use secondary uvularization, which is generally not distinguished from pharyngealization, for the "emphatic" coronal consonants.

Examples of pharyngealized consonants
(Uvularized consonants are not distinguished.)

Stops
pharyngealized voiceless alveolar stop  (in Chechen, Berber, Arabic, Mizrahi and Classical Hebrew)
pharyngealized voiced alveolar stop  (in Chechen, Tamazight and Arabic)
pharyngealized voiceless bilabial stop  (in Chechen and Ubykh)
pharyngealized voiced bilabial stop  (in Chechen, Ubykh, Siwa, Shihhi Arabic and Iraqi Arabic, allophonic in Adyghe and Kabardian)
pharyngealized voiceless uvular stop  (in Ubykh, Tsakhur, Archi, Arabic and Classical Hebrew)
pharyngealized voiced uvular stop  (in Tsakhur)
pharyngealized glottal stop  (in Shihhi Arabic; allophonic in Chechen)

Fricatives
pharyngealized voiceless alveolar sibilant  (in Chechen, Arabic, Classical Hebrew and Northern Berber)
pharyngealized voiced alveolar sibilant  (in Chechen, Berber and Arabic)
pharyngealized voiceless postalveolar fricative  (in Chechen; also a hypercorrection of the Modern Hebrew )
pharyngealized voiced postalveolar fricative  (in Chechen)
pharyngealized voiceless dental fricative 
pharyngealized voiced dental fricative  (in Arabic ظ)
pharyngealized voiced alveolar lateral fricative  (in Classical Arabic)
pharyngealized voiceless labiodental fricative 
pharyngealized voiced labiodental fricative  (in Ubykh)
pharyngealized voiceless uvular fricative  (in Ubykh, Tsakhur, Archi and Bzyb Abkhaz)
pharyngealized voiced uvular fricative  (in Ubykh, Tsakhur and Archi)
pharyngealized voiceless glottal fricative  (in Tsakhur)

Affricates
pharyngealized voiceless alveolar affricate  (in Chechen)
pharyngealized voiced alveolar affricate  (in Chechen)
pharyngealized voiceless postalveolar affricate  (in Chechen)
pharyngealized voiced postalveolar affricate  (in Chechen)

Trills
pharyngealized voiced alveolar trill  (in Chechen and Siwa)

Nasals
pharyngealized bilabial nasal  (in Chechen, Ubykh, Darija, and Iraqi Arabic)
pharyngealized alveolar nasal  (in Chechen)

Approximants
pharyngealized labialized velar approximant  (in Shihhi Arabic, Chechen and Ubykh)
pharyngealized alveolar lateral approximant  (in Chechen, Northern Standard Dutch and Arabic)
pharyngealized labialized postalveolar approximant  (in American English)
pharyngealized velar approximant , with the body of the tongue bunched up at the velum (in some dialects of American English and Dutch)

Examples of pharyngealized vowels
pharyngealized open-mid back rounded vowel  (in Northern Standard Dutch)
pharyngealized vowels in the Air Tamajeq language

See also
Velarization
Creaky voice (laryngealization)
Pharyngeal consonant
Epiglottal consonant
Pharynx

Notes

References

Further reading
Ian Maddieson, Typology and occurrence of pharyngeals and pharyngealization around the world.

Phonetics
Pharyngeal consonants
Secondary articulation